Knute Heldner (1875 – November 5, 1952) was a Swedish-American artist.

Biography
Knute August Heldner was born in the village Vederslöv in Växjö Municipality, Kronoberg County, Sweden. His early formal training was at Karlskrona Technical School and the Royal Swedish Academy of Arts in Stockholm. He migrated to the United States around 1902 and trained at the Minneapolis College of Art and Design in Minneapolis. He lived in Duluth, Minnesota until 1934. He was married to Collette Pope Heldner (1902–1990) who was also a painter and his one time student from the Rachel McFadden Art Studio in Duluth.

He won the gold medal at the Minnesota State Fair in 1915.  In 1921 he exhibited his work in the Swedish American Artist's Association in the Swedish Club of Chicago. His style was modern expressionistic, derived from his training as an artist in Sweden. He was recognized for painting of Louisiana landscapes. His best paintings however were portraits. His work entitled Bearers of burdens was turned into a print.
Heldner and his wife eventually made their  home in New Orleans, Louisiana, returning to Minnesota during the summer.
Knute Heldner died in 1952 in Orleans Parish, Louisiana at 77 years of age.

References

Other sources
Collette Pope Heldner. Artists' Bluebook
Knute Heldner, Artists' Bluebook
Louisiana State University Museum of Art brochure

1875 births
1952 deaths
People from Växjö Municipality
19th-century Swedish painters
19th-century American male artists
Swedish male painters
20th-century Swedish painters
20th-century American male artists
19th-century American painters
American male painters
20th-century American painters
Swedish emigrants to the United States
Federal Art Project artists
19th-century Swedish male artists
20th-century Swedish male artists